Order of the Freedom can refer to:

Order of Freedom (Yugoslavia) - Yugoslavian military decoration
Order of Freedom (Bosnia and Herzegovina)
Order of Liberty - Portuguese honorific civil order